The Castello San Vito dei Visconti in Somma Lombardo, currently called the Visconti Castle of Somma Lombardo is a medieval castle-palace in Somma Lombardo, Province of Varese, Lombardy, northern Italy.

History
Buildings at the site date from the 9th century; a fortress, from the 13th century. In 1448, the brothers Francesco and Guido Visconti, took refuge in this town and castle from the forces of the Ambrosian Republic. They divided the landholdings and portions of the castle. The fortress has been amalgamated from adjacent residences, all once surrounded by a single moat. From the brother Francesco, who owned the newer portion of the castle, descend the Visconti di San Vito; while from Guido, who owned the lower and older portions of the castle, descend the Visconti di Modrone.

The San Vito castle contains frescoes attributed to the school of Camillo Procaccini and an altarpiece by Cerano. The castle also has an extensive collection of barber plates.

Parts of the castle are used for private events and open for guided tours.

References

Sources

External links
Official site
Lombardia Beni Culturali – Castello Visconti, Somma Lombardo (VA)

Visconteo Somma
Buildings and structures in the Province of Varese
Somma Lombardo